(sometimes named  or ) is a tool to convert line breaks in a text file from Unix format (Line feed) to DOS format (carriage return + Line feed) and vice versa.  When invoked as  the program will convert a Unix text file to DOS format, when invoked as  it will convert a DOS text file to UNIX format.

Usage
Unix2dos and dos2unix are not part of the Unix standard. Commercial Unixes usually come with their own implementation of unix2dos/dos2unix, like SunOS/Solaris's dos2unix/unix2dos, HP-UX's dos2ux/ux2dos and Irix's to_unix/to_dos.

There exist many open source alternatives with different command names and options like dos2unix/unix2dos, d2u/u2d, endlines, flip. The multi-call binary busybox includes an implementation of unix2dos/dos2unix.

See the manual page of the respective commands.

Alternatives to unix2dos conversion

Alternatives to dos2unix conversion
For the opposite conversion it is possible to use, for example, the utility tr with the  flag to remove the carriage return characters:
 $ tr -d '\r' < file > file2 # For ASCII and other files which do not contain multibyte characters (Not utf-8 safe).
 $ perl -i -p -e 's/\r//g' file
 $ sed -i -e 's/\r//g' file

Note: The above method assumes there are only DOS line breaks in the input file. Any Mac line breaks (\r) present in the input will be removed.

An alternative to the dos2unix conversion is possible by using the  command that is available on Linux and other Unix-like operating systems, including Mac OS X.  In the following case, InFile contains the undesired DOS (^M) line endings.  After execution, OutFile is either created or replaced, and contains UNIX line endings.  The  option tells  not to output backspace characters.
$ col -b < InFile > OutFile

See also
 Newline

References

External links
 Tofrodos - software that provides dos2unix and unix2dos
 Dos2Unix - Dos2Unix / Unix2Dos - Text file format converters

System administration
Unix text processing utilities